Guy Morançon (born 5 December 1927) is a French composer and organist.

Biography 
Born in Marseille, Guy Morançon studied music at the Marseile conservatory, then at the Accademia Musicale Chigiana, the Gregorian Institute of Paris and the Conservatoire de Paris. His main masters were Marcel Prévot in organ, Alexandre Eugène Cellier, Marcel Dupré, in orchestra direction, Louis Fourestier, Paul van Kempen, Carl Schuricht, in chorus direction, Élisabeth Brasseur, and Pierre Revel, Louis Saguer and Olivier Messiaen in writing and music composition.

First appointed as the maître de chapelle of the Basilica of Notre-Dame-des-Victoires, Paris, he then became the titular organist, whose casing, for Cavaillé-Coll, was one of the most beautiful in France. A soloist at Radio France, he also performed with the Orchestre de Paris, and La Chapelle Royale; he performed under the direction of conductors such as Pierre Boulez, Semyon Bychkov, Emmanuel Krivine,  and Philippe Herreweghe.

Several countries welcome him for concerts and tours, in particular the United States of America, Finland, Germany... His very vast repertoire, extends from the music of the Middle Ages to today, and gives a lot of space to the French authors, Couperin, but also Lefébure-Wély, Bonnal, Messiaen.

In 1962, he founded the Jean-Baptiste Lully choruses, which he conducted until 1977, and with which he gave the great works of the sacred repertoire, from Roland de Lassus to Olivier Messiaen, with the collaboration of international soloists such as Maria Stader, Aldo Ciccolini, Jacques Villisech, Yvonne Loriod, Yi-Kwei Sze, Elizabeth Harwood, Rita Streich. The main Parisian orchestras participated in these concerts.

One example is the complete creation in France of the oratorio Elijah by Mendelssohn in the presence of a descendant of the German composer. Only excerpts had previously been given, mainly by the 19th century Orchestre de la Société des concerts du Conservatoire.

As a composer, among an important and varied catalogue, are Œnochoé, choreographic symphony, Tropes, for great organ and 6 percussions, Solstices, for flute and piano, La Messe des Bergers de Provence, for traditional men's voices and instruments, Music for organ and strings, Suite Latine, Sirventès, Petit Livre pour la guitare, La Messe de Verlaine, for women's voices, piano, percussion and ondes Martenot, Enneagone for trio of reeds and string orchestra, Dix Noëls de Provence, old-fashioned treatises for organ, Sept Pastorales for wind quintet, Salicornesfor viola and piano.

His latest creation took place at the Val-de-Grâce in 2009. Several of these works were state commissions and were recorded on discs by performers from other countries, particularly in Great Britain. For the most part, his Noëls de Provence use traditional themes that neither Nicolas Saboly nor others after him had ever transcribed for organ or chorus. Their success has been considerable, both in France and abroad. Most recently, in Quebec City, twelve organists played twelve of his christmas parts.

From 1982 to 1991, he was Director of the Nadia Boulanger conservatory then Inspector and Chargé de mission to the Inspecteur général de la Musique for the Ville de Paris. He presides the "Musique au Val-de-Grâce" association.

A chevalier of the Ordre des Arts et Lettres and silver medalist of the city of Paris, Guy Morançon has thus seen his musical activities unfold over the years in various directions, namely those of the concert organ, the liturgical organ, the conducting of choirs and orchestras, private and public education and composition, to which must be added numerous organ inaugurations. In addition, he regularly transcribes for organ pages by Liszt or Mozart, Beethoven and Bach.
 
Guy Morançon recorded at Iramac (the world premiere of Mendelssohn's complete world of his organ works), Arion, Inédits-ORTF, Elyon, Jade, Mandala, Pathé-Marconi/EMI.

Works 
 Dix noëls de Provence, for organ
 Quatre autres noëls de Provence, for organ
 Three pieces for grand organ
 Three studies for string orchestra, after Paolo Uccello
 Sirventès, for guitar
 Music for organ and strings
 Fantasy on a theme by Heinrich Schütz, for lute with 8 choruses
 Messe de Verlaine, for female vocal chorus (1 to 4 parts) and three instruments: piano, percussion and ondes Martenot
 Enneagone, for reed trio (oboe, clarinet, bassoon) and string orchestra
 Différenciations, for four bass trombones
 Divertissement, for flute, oboe, cello and harpsichord
 Divertissement, version for flute, clarinet, violin, cello and harpsichord
 Sept pastorales, for wind quintet
 Salicornes, for viola and piano
 Prélude à l'Ile mystérieuse, in tribute to Jules Verne, for ten stringed instruments
 Ballade Le page tremblant, lyrics by Paul Fort, for choir a cappella
 String quartet
 Linéaires, for mixed choir, on lyrics by Albert Ginet
 Le navire qui chante dans l'arbre, for choir, on lyrics by Paul Fort

These pieces are the perfect expression of the composer's roots and language. Pastorales for wind instruments after traditional Provencal Christmas, pieces for strings not seeking an illusory modernity, but of a great sincerity of writing. A concerto for three wind instruments soloists and string orchestra, in which the soloists compete with each other as well as with the orchestra, a magnificent page with a flexible and virtuoso writing. Voice pieces that show an intimate knowledge of the voice. The shadow of his master Messiaen passes fugitively on some pages, as if to underline better that of these influences has forged an indisputable personality. The great French tradition, the colors of Provence as well as a subtle contemporary harmony, and the rigour of writing.

Discography 
 Integral of the organ work of Mendelssohn, by Guy Morançon at the organ of the Church of St. Ouen, Rouen, Iramac
 Noëls de Provence, by Guy Morançon, by the composer at the great organ of the Basilica of Notre-Dame-des-Victoires, Paris, Mandala
 Enneagone for oboe, clarinet, bassoon and string orchestra, Seven Pastorals for wind quintet, Three studies for string orchestra, after to Paolo Uccello, by various soloists, Moscow Contemporary Music Ensemble and Russian National Orchestra String Orchestra, conducted by Jean Thorel, Le Chant du Monde
 Musique pour orgue et cordes, by Hervé Désarbre, on the Cavaillé-Coll organ of the église du Val-de-Grâce, and the orchestral Ensemble Stringendo directed by Jean Thorel, Mandala
 Messe des bergers de Provence, by the Baladins de la Chanson choir, directed by Henri Bouteille
 Schubert, Schumann, Rabaud, Fauré, Morançon, by Guy Deplus, clarinet, and Guy Morançon at the Grand Organ of the Basilica N.-D. des Victoires, Jade
 Mozart, works for organ (Sonatas, Choral, March, Variations) by Guy Morançon at the Grand Organ of the Basilica N.-D. des Victoires, Mandala
 Claude Balbastre, La Marche des Marseillais, by Guy Morançon, Teldec
 Guy Morançon, noëls de Provence, by Rupert Gough, on the Royal Holloway organ, London University, Regent

References

External links 
 Guy Morançon on the website of Val-de-Grâce
 Mendelssohn Sonate 1. Guy Morançon à Saint-Ouen de Rouen on YouTube
 Guy Morançon on Le Chant du monde
 Guy Morançon on France Orgue
 Guy Morançon on parisenimages.fr

20th-century French composers
Conservatoire de Paris alumni
French classical organists
French male organists
1927 births
Musicians from Marseille
Living people
Chevaliers of the Ordre des Arts et des Lettres
21st-century organists
20th-century French male musicians
21st-century French male musicians
Male classical organists